Borstlap is a surname. Notable people with the surname include:

 John Borstlap (born 1950), Dutch composer and author
 Michiel Borstlap (born 1966), Dutch pianist and composer
 Tjeerd Borstlap (born 1955), Dutch field hockey player